Actinidia deliciosa, the fuzzy kiwifruit,  is a fruiting vine native to Southern China. Other species of Actinidia are also found in China and range east to Japan and north into southern areas of Russian Far East. This species grows naturally at altitudes between 600 and 2,000 m.

Description and ecology
Actinidia deliciosa is a vigorous, woody, twining vine or climbing shrub reaching 9 m.

The black-lyre leafroller moth (“Cnephasia” jactatana) is one of the few commercially significant pests of this plant.

Leaves

Its leaves are alternate, long-petioled, deciduous, oval to nearly circular, cordate at the base, and 7.5–12.5 cm long. Young leaves are coated with red hairs; mature leaves are dark-green and hairless on the upper surface, and downy-white with prominent, light-colored veins beneath.

Flowers

The flowers are fragrant, dioecious or unisexual, borne singly or in threes in the leaf axils, are five- to six-petalled, white at first, changing to buff-yellow, 2.5–5 cm broad, and both sexes have central tufts of many stamens, though those of the female flowers with no viable pollen. The flowers also lack nectar. Male and female flowers appear on different plants (dioecious), and both sexes have to be planted in close proximity for fruit set. Bees are normally used by commercial orchards, although the more labour-intensive hand pollination is sometimes employed. Male flowers are gathered and processed to extract their pollen. This is then sprayed back on to the female flowers.

Fruits

The oblong fruits are up to 6.25 cm long. The russet-brown skin of the fruits is densely covered with short, stiff, brown hairs.  The flesh is firm until fully ripened; it is glistening, juicy and luscious. The color of the flesh is bright-green, or sometimes yellow, brownish or off-white, except for the white, succulent center from which radiate many fine, pale lines.  The flavor is subacid to quite acid; the flavor is suggested to be similar to that of the gooseberry or strawberry.

Varieties and cultivars
Four botanical varieties, Actinidia deliciosa var. deliciosa, Actinidia deliciosa var. chlorocarpa, Actinidia deliciosa var. longipila and Actinidia deliciosa var. coloris were suggested. However, this subdivision is generally rejected.

Zhong hua (Chinese gooseberry), jing li (northern pear gooseberry), ruan zao (soft date gooseberry), and mao hua (may be tight- or loose-haired) are the four main cultivars of this species in China. 'Abbott', 'Allison', 'Bruno', 'Hayward', Monty ('Montgomery'), and 'Greensill' are the most significant cultivars in New Zealand.

History
In 1847, specimens of the plant were collected by the agent for the Royal Horticultural Society, London.  Cultivation spread from China in the early 20th century when seeds were introduced to New Zealand by Isabel Fraser, the principal of Wanganui Girls' College, who had been visiting mission schools in China. The seeds were planted in 1906 by a Wanganui nurseryman, Alexander Allison, with the vines first fruiting in 1910.

People who tasted the fruit thought it had a gooseberry flavour, so began to call it the Chinese gooseberry, but being from the genus Actinidia, it is not related to the gooseberry family, Grossulariaceae.
The familiar cultivar Actinidia deliciosa 'Hayward' was developed by Hayward Wright in Avondale, New Zealand, around 1924. This is the most widely grown cultivar in the world. Chinese gooseberry was initially grown in domestic gardens, but commercial planting began in the 1940s. In 1959, Turners and Growers named it kiwifruit, after New Zealand's national bird, the kiwi—brown and furry.

, Italy was the leading producer of kiwifruit in the world, followed by New Zealand, Chile, France, Greece, Japan, and the United States. In China, it is grown mainly in the mountainous area upstream of the Yangtze River. It is also grown in other areas of China, including Sichuan.

In 2016, global production of kiwifruit was 4.3 million tonnes, led by China with 56% of the world total. Italy and New Zealand were other major producers.

In 2010 and 2011, kiwifruit vines worldwide, in Italy, France, and New Zealand, suffered devastating attacks by a bacterial disease caused by Pseudomonas syringae pv. actinidiae, with some of the New Zealand attacks by the virulent strain PSA-V. The disease had first been noticed in Japan in the 1980s, and subsequently in northern Italy (1992) and South Korea.

See also
Kiwifruit
Kiwifruit industry in New Zealand
Actinidia arguta, the hardy kiwi

References

External links 

deliciosa
Crops originating from China
Flora of China
Fruits originating in East Asia
Garden plants of Asia
Vines
Dioecious plants